The 1995 SMU Mustangs football team represented Southern Methodist University (SMU) as a member of the Southwest Conference (SWC) during the 1995 NCAA Division I-A football season. Led by fifth-year head coach Tom Rossley, the Mustangs compiled an overall record of 1–10 with a mark of 0–7 in conference play, placing last out of eight teams in the SWC.

SMU returned to the Cotton Bowl on a permanent basis for the first time since 1978. The Cotton Bowl was SMU's home stadium from 1932 through 1978, during which SMU rose to national prominence. SMU opened the season with an upset over eventual Southeastern Conference (SEC) Western Division champion Arkansas, 17–14. This was SMU's final season in the SWC, their home since 1918. SMU, along with TCU and Rice, joined the Western Athletic Conference (WAC) in 1996.

Schedule

Roster

References

SMU
SMU Mustangs football seasons
SMU Mustangs football